Aitana is a mountain massif that is part of Prebaetic System in the eastern end of the Iberian Peninsula. Administratively, the mountainous area is located in the Marina Baixa, Alcoià and Comtat comarcas in the northern part of Alicante province, Valencian Community, Spain. Its peak at 1,558 metres above sea level is the highest point of the province.

Geography
Aitana mountain range is spread over an area of 2,000 hectares, about ten miles from the Mediterranean coast. Apart from Aitana, the highest peak that gives the name to the mountain system, other notable peaks are Penya Alta (1,506 m), Penya Catxa (1,467 m), El Mulero (1,308 m) and Alt del Carrascar (1,208 m).

Aitana is also a common girls' name in the areas surrounding the mountain range. The summit has also been a mountain finish in la Vuelta a España a number of times.  The Alto de Aitana is a 22.3 kilometer long grinder and has an average gradient of 6% and can also be compared with Mount Ventoux, though Ventoux is steeper.

Ascending to the top of Aitana. 
There are some routes in order to climb the top. We can go there almost all the year round except of irregular snowy periods during Winter. One route is about 18 kilometers round trip.

We divide the route into three «stages»:

Puerto Tudons - Font de l’Arbre.  You can reach the font de l’Arbre by car from Confrides. They are 7 km on a narrow track.

Font de l’arbre - Font de la Forata. You can get there from Benifato too.

The most spectacular is the part: Font de Partagás - Pas de la rabossa - Summit of Aitana with the distance of 2 km. We start at 1040 meters high, with which we have almost 500 meters of unevenness. The path is perfectly signposted with trail markings and distance signs.

The first section of just over 4 kilometers begins on the CV-770 with a long climb of 2.5 km. To the right we have the walls of the Sierra de Aitana and to the left alternate pines, holm oaks, viewpoints with beautiful views of the valley with the towns of Alcolecha and Ares del Bosque and already abandoned terraces.

A small descent will take us to our first stop: La Font de l’Arbre. Very interesting are the rests of rocky “snow reservoirs” used during centenaries to deliver ice cubes to the towns below.

La Font de l’Arbre is a recreational area with wooden tables, a barbecue and a source of fresh and crystalline water. A good place to refuel since its deciduous trees will give us shade in summer and let the sun pass in winter. We can also see some farmhouses and the refuge hostel.

Font de l’arbre - Font de la Forata. 3 km

The next section goes from Font de l’Arbre to Font de la Forata. Three kilometers of continuous slight climb until just before reaching the Font de la Forata. The path runs between pine trees on one side and the walls of the mountains on the other. The forest track is good and well marked.

La font de la Forata is a flat area with grass and some pipes where a stream of water runs down. From here we can already see the top of Aitana with the radars at the top. A little further to the left is the impressive Pas de La Rabosa. Through that cleft in the mountain we will have to pass. From here you can also get to Benifato by the walking pass PR-CV 21.

Font de la Forata - Pas de la rabossa - Summit of Aitana. 2 km

So we continue the road to Pas de La Rabosa along the so-called Passet de La Rabosa botanical trail. We will find wooden panels that explain this micro-reserve of flora. The cushioned plants that have had to adapt to the blizzard and the rigors of the cold winter in this part of the mountains stand out. We have the pass very close and we will have to climb a little. We climb through the chaos of rocks detached from the mountain, easily but carefully, and through a small corridor between rocks, Pas de la Rabosa, we access the other side of Aitana. From here the views are tremendous and we can see all the way.

Aitana Pas de la Rabosa. We cross the pass and follow the path along some spectacular cracks. They are the chasms of Partagás. The natural spectacle is amazing. These cracks, 15 or 20 meters wide, can be more than 100 meters deep. They have been formed by the dissolution of limestone rock by the action of water and snow. That is why apart from the chasm we can see all those absolutely breathtaking rocks that make up this mountain range.

Appearances in Vuelta a España (since 2001)

See also
Mountains of the Valencian Community

References

External links
 Walking route to Aitana (in English)
 Aitana Mountain  Asociación de Geógrafos Españoles (in Spanish)
 Colla Ecologista La Carrasca

Mountains of the Valencian Community
Baetic System